Whiskeytown may refer to:

Geography
 Whiskeytown Unit, one of the units of the Whiskeytown–Shasta–Trinity National Recreation Area in Shasta County, Northern California
 Whiskeytown, California, an unincorporated community in the Whiskeytown Unit flooded in the process of creating Whiskeytown Lake
 Whiskeytown Lake, a reservoir in the Whiskeytown Unit
 Whiskeytown Falls, a three-tiered waterfall in the Whiskeytown Unit

Music
 Whiskeytown, a former American rock/alternative country band

See also
 Whiskeytown–Shasta–Trinity National Recreation Area